Yusuf Bayk is a village in northern Aleppo Governorate, northern Syria.

With 1,138 inhabitants, as per the 2004 census, Yusuf Bayk administratively belongs to Nahiya Jarabulus within Jarabulus District. Nearby localities include Haymar  to the north, Qandariyah  to the west, and Mazaalah  to the southeast.

References

Populated places in Jarabulus District